Marios Orfanidis (born 16 March 1940) is a Cypriot footballer. He played in five matches for the Cyprus national football team in 1965.

References

External links
 

1940 births
Living people
Cypriot footballers
Cyprus international footballers
Place of birth missing (living people)
Association footballers not categorized by position